Benndorf is a district of the town Frohburg in the Landkreis Leipzig district of Saxony, Germany. The former independent municipality became a district of Frohburg on 1 January 1997. Since 1948, the former independent municipality Bubendorf became part of Benndorf.

Geography and traffic

Location 
The village is situated in the valley of the Wyhra river 2 km north of Frohburg and 7 km southeast of Borna. Benndorf is 30 km south of Leipzig. West of it - in the forest - is the Thuringia state border.

Roads 

Benndorf is connected to state route 51, on which one can reach the  near Borna, by two narrow streets. Benndorf has bus connections to Borna, Altenburg and Frohburg.

Railroad 
The Frohburg rail station is two kilometers northeast of Benndorf. It is connected via local trains to Leipzig and Geithain.

Airports 
The closest airport, the Leipzig-Altenburg Airport at Nobitz, is situated 15 km south of Benndorf. The next closest airports with regular flight plans are Airport Leipzig/Halle 70 km north and Airport Dresden 110 km east.

Hiking and biking 

Benndorf is connected to many hiking and biking paths.

Neighborhood 
Benndorf is bordered by the following neighborhoods (clockwise, starting from the north): Bubendorf, Frohburg, Eschefeld, Pahna and Wyhra.

History 

See also History of Benndorf (Frohburg).

The village was first mentioned in a document in 1216. It was independent until 1 January 1997 when Benndorf was incorporated into the city Frohburg.

Population and demographics

Attractions 

 Village church Benndorf, first mentioned in 1352
 Manor buildings
 Archway
 Castle Park  with lines of the former castle and newly designed fountain
 Orangerie

 The small village museum on the island
 Mill
 Gatehouse of the former four-page court Kaube, today nursing station
 Truss house at the village square

 The "alley" in their entirety
 Tudor style house A. Kobsch
 Community Centre (former village school from 1899)
 The Maisterlabyrinth, a corn maze near the road to Bubendorf (Open from July to September)
 The Luther-Hiking-Way between Borna and Gnandstein performs Benndorf

Church 

In Benndorf is a Lutheran Church, which belongs since 2000 to parish Frohburg.

The oldest message about the church dates back to 1352. Until the year 1524 the Bergkloster of Chemnitz had the patronage. The Church to Benndorf was under his abbot. Only under the last abbot Hilary has the monastery lost this law. Since Benndorf belonged to Electorate of Saxony, Luther's teaching already early find input. Since then the Benndorf Church is evangelical.

The present church building was erected around the year 1500. In 1863, the internal of the church was renovated extensively. Another renovation took place from 1980 to 1983.

The altar, dating from 1506, consists of a central shrine and two wings. The central shrine contains the carved in wood and brightly painted figures of Saint George, Maria with the child and the Saint Barbara. On the wings are in groups of 3 the 12 Apostle. The altar is, as well as the one in Eschefeld, which it is very similar to the work, of an Altenburg art carving school.

The bells (three bronze bells) was poured around 1500. The treasures of the church include the organ of Urban Kreutzbach from Borna, which was built in the redesign 1863.

There is a memorial plaque for the First World War fallen soldiers on the north side of the church.

List of pastor to Benndorf

Since 1974, the parish Benndorf is co-managed by Frohburg. The church is located at the beginning of the road "Bubendorfer Straße". In the opposite house No. 2 was located earlier the ministry.

Mill 

The mill was once built by monks from the Merseburg pen. For the first time it is mentioned in documents in the year 1365. Margrave Frederick certain then that the mill had to deliver annually a small sum of money, a lamb belly, a loaf of bread and two capons to certain matins after Frohburg. 
Earlier on the year of construction remembered a mounted above the door of the mill building date: 1365. The above Inappropriate Crest is the family of Wrangel. It is surrounded by the letters IMDHT, be interpreted as follows: H (oc), I (n), M (anu), D (omini), T (utiseemum), which means "the mill is safest in the hands of God" is intended to mean. 
Until 1500 there was darkness over the fate of the mill. They should in the  Hussite wars have been destroyed with the village Benndorf and rebuilt after. Then hinted a ledge of fired bricks, which is said to have pulled around the building.
Former owners were the lords of Kreutzen and Nickel von Techwitz from Frohburg, later, Mr. von Einsiedel in Benndorf which the mill each leased. 
1921 burned sheds and stables and 1925 the main building down, after which the mill was rebuilt. 1935 it leased from Georg Bufe. In 1940/41 there was a modernization, in a modern Francis turbine was built for its own power generation. The work was performed by French prisoners of war. 
1945 was VdgB – BHG of Saxony owner of the mill. In 1957 she was communal property. From 1958, the mill belonged to the LPG "Free farmers Benndorf". Miller was Artur Abendroth. In 1968 the mill has been set.
Currently, the family Scheffler owns the mill building, which also serves as the headquarters of their construction company and was extensively restored and modernized.

The mill is located at the address "An der Kantine 6".

Forge 

The owner of the smithy.

The forge is today still in operation.
After the incorporation of Eulatal to Frohburg the former so called road "Frohburger Straße" in Benndorf has been renamed and is now called "An der Schmiede" (at the smithy). The building is located at number 3.

Archway 

The gatehouse Benndorf (the arch) is a two-storey gatehouse with slightly drawn early Mittelrisalit and Mansardwalmdach, built in the typical Baroque of the 18th century. After this building, the street is named from the village square to the manor: "Zum Torbogen" (For archway). The gatehouse was formed for centuries the link between manor and village and separated at the same time in 1856, the independent legal districts "Rittergut Benndorf" and "village community Benndorf".
Until the dissolution of the Voluntary Fire Brigade the Benndorf fire engine was parked here in the gatehouse and housed the equipment for the comrades. In 2012 the building changed from municipal to private ownership

School 

The school building of Benndorf was built in 1899 and was used until 1970 in as such. After that, the students had to go Nenkersdorf or Frohburg. The building was then only the after-school club. Meanwhile, the building is used as a community center. On the ground floor there is a large function room with a small kitchen and toilet. Usage is both of the local clubs and private. Upstairs a rented apartment has arisen. Nearby is located the public playground and a barbecue grill. On the roof of the building a siren is attached.
The Benndorf children go to daycare "Stork's nest" and "sparrow's nest" in Frohburg and the "Rainbow Country" Greifenhain and the "Villa Kunterbunt" in Eschefeld.
The primary school children are taught in the Frohburg primary school. Thither there is a direct connection to the school bus. In addition, can be visited there, the school care centers "Sly Foxes" and "The Einstein". From the fifth grade are high school "Maxim Gorky" in Frohburg and the Gymnasium "Am Breiten Teich" in Borna, the "International Business School" in Geithain, the "Johannes-Mathesius-Gymnasium" in Rochlitz, the "Freies Gymnasium" in Penig and the "Christian Spalatin Gymnasium" in Altenburg to selection. 
Upcoming colleges and universities are located in Leipzig, Mittweida, Chemnitz and Zwickau.

Organizations 
As of 2020, the following clubs and organisations operate in Benndorf:
 Church choir Benndorf
 Male Choir "Germania" Benndorf
 Posaunenchor Benndorf / Bubendorf
 Förderverein Rittergut Benndorf
 Dartclub Benndorf

Every year at the first weekend in September, the joint Benndorf summer festival and on December 6, the traditional feast of St. Nicholas take place.

Literature

References 

Former municipalities in Saxony
Leipzig (district)